Robert Castellanos (born May 11, 1998) is an American professional soccer player, who currently plays as a central defender for Major League Soccer club Sporting Kansas City.

Career

Professional
Castellanos was born in Palmdale, California and attended Estancia High School.
On February 14, 2017, he signed with United Soccer League club LA Galaxy II out of the youth academy of Club Atlas of the Liga MX.

After three seasons with Rio Grande Valley FC, the club declined their contract option on Castellanos following their 2020 season.

On February 17, 2021, Castellanos signed with MLS side Nashville SC. Castellanos was loaned to USL Championship side Tampa Bay Rowdies on March 11, 2022. Following the 2022 season, his contract option was declined by Nashville.

On 26 January 2023, Castellanos signed for Finnish club KuPS ahead of the 2023 season with the option to extend the deal for a further year.

After just three Finnish League Cup appearances for KuPS, Castellanos returned to the United States on February 17, 2023, signing with MLS side Sporting Kansas City.

International
In August 2016, Castellanos was called into a camp by the United States at the U20 level.

References

External links
Nomads SC bio

1998 births
Living people
American soccer players
Association football defenders
LA Galaxy II players
People from Palmdale, California
Soccer players from California
Sportspeople from Los Angeles County, California
United States men's youth international soccer players
Rio Grande Valley FC Toros players
USL Championship players
Nashville SC players
Tampa Bay Rowdies players
Kuopion Palloseura players
Sporting Kansas City players
American expatriate soccer players
Expatriate footballers in Finland
American expatriate sportspeople in Finland